Real Love is the second Korean-language studio album (fifth overall) by South Korean girl group Oh My Girl. It was released on March 28, 2022, by WM Entertainment, about eleven months after the latest EP, Dear OhMyGirl (2021), The album consists of ten tracks, including the lead single of the same name. In South Korea, Real Love debuted at number five on the Gaon Album Chart, and has sold 96,880 copies as of April. It was the group's last album to feature former group member Jiho, who left the group in May 2022.

Track listing

Charts

Weekly charts

Monthly charts

References

2022 albums
Korean-language albums
Oh My Girl albums
Sony Music albums